Brother Chidananda (born Christopher Hartwell Bagley, 1953) is the fifth President of Self-Realization Fellowship/Yogoda Satsanga Society of India, founded by Paramahansa Yogananda. He was born in Annapolis, Maryland, USA.

Biography 
Chidananda is the son of Admiral David H. Bagley, former commander-in-chief of U.S. naval forces in Europe, and Charlotte Lee Bagley, née Hartwell. His first contact with the teachings of Paramahansa Yogananda was in the early 1970s in Encinitas, California – where SRF has a retreat and ashram center – when he was a student of sociology and philosophy at the University of California, San Diego. He graduated from the university in 1975. Months later, he came across a copy of Autobiography of a Yogi. Chidananda applied and entered the monks’ postulant ashram of SRF in Encinitas in 1977. He completed his postulant training in 1979 and was transferred to the SRF Headquarters at Mt. Washington and was assigned to editorial work in the Publications Department. He was appointed a member of the SRF and YSS Boards of Directors in 2009. His monastic name Chidananda means bliss (ananda) through the infinite Divine Consciousness (chit).

On 30 August 2017, he was elected as the next president and spiritual head of Self-Realization Fellowship/Yogoda Satsanga Society of India in a unanimous vote by the SRF Board of Directors. He succeeded Sri Mrinalini Mata, who died in early August 2017. Chidananda oversees the society’s monastic order, the 800 temples, meditation centers, and retreats around the world. He also oversees the fellowship's publications department, humanitarian activities and is the editor-in-chief of SRF Publications.

References

External links 
 Video : Overcoming Negativity in Today’s World, 10/ 2018
 Video : SRF Convocation, 8/ 2018
 Video : SRF Convocation, 8/ 2017
 Video : Remembering Sri Daya Mata, 12/ 2010
 Video : Special interview with Swami Chidananda Giri, President Self Realization Fellowship and Yogoda Satsanga Society of India/ लॉस एंजल्स से आए SRF के अध्यक्ष स्वामी चिदानंद गिरी से योग पर विशेष बातचीत, 11/ 2019

1953 births
American yogis
Devotees of Paramahansa Yogananda
Kriya yogis
Living people
People from Annapolis, Maryland